The .45-60 Winchester is a centerfire rifle cartridge intended for 19th-century big-game hunting. Winchester Repeating Arms Company shortened the .45-70 government cartridge to operate through the Winchester Model 1876 rifle's lever-action.

The Colt Lightning Carbine and the Whitney Arms Company's Kennedy lever-action rifle were also chambered for the .45-60. These early rifles' advantage of faster loading for subsequent shots was soon eclipsed by the stronger and smoother Winchester Model 1886 action capable of handling longer cartridges including the popular full length .45-70. The .45-60 and similarly short cartridges designed for the Model 1876 rifle faded into obsolescence as 20th-century hunters preferred more powerful smokeless powder loadings of cartridges designed for stronger rifles. Winchester production of .45-60 cartridges ended during the great depression.

Dimensions

See also
 List of Winchester Center Fire cartridges
 Table of handgun and rifle cartridges
 List of cartridges by caliber
 List of rifle cartridges
 .44-40 Winchester
 .444 Marlin
 .44 Henry
 .450 No 2 Nitro Express

References

External links

 Winchester Model 1876 Sporting Rifle in .45-60 Winchester
 Handloading the .45-60 WCF (from LoadData.com)
 Handloading the .45-60 WCF (from Rifle Magazine)
 Tom Horn Made Use of Winchesters — A Model 1894 and Maybe a Centennial
 Cimarron Tom Horn Winchester 1876 Review
 
 
 

Pistol and rifle cartridges
Winchester Repeating Arms Company cartridges